WMTD-FM (102.3 MHz) is a sports formatted broadcast radio station licensed to Hinton, West Virginia, serving Beckley, West Virginia.  WMTD-FM is owned and operated by Kenneth Allman, through licensee Mountainplex Media II, LLC.

History
On April 5, 2010, WMTD-FM switched from classic rock to sports as "ESPN 102.3, The Ticket" picking up the full national lineup of ESPN Radio personalities.

References

External links
ESPN 102.3, The Ticket Online

MTD-FM
Radio stations established in 1985
1985 establishments in West Virginia